Jesuitenmission, the mission arm of the Society of Jesus in Germany, directs its assistance to the German Jesuit foreign missions, mainly in India, East Timor, China, and Zimbabwe. Pursuing the service of faith and promotion of justice, its works include combating poverty, refugee assistance, education, health, ecology, human rights and pastoral work, while fostering dialogue between cultures and religions.

References

Jesuit development centres
Catholic Church in Germany
Charities based in Germany
Social welfare charities
Cultural promotion organizations
Peace organizations
International educational charities
Christian refugee aid organizations
Non-profit organisations based in Bavaria